The 6th local elections were held in South Korea on 4 June 2014.

Provincial level elections

Metropolitan mayoral and gubernatorial elections

Metropolitan mayoral election winners

Gubernatorial election winners

Provincial legislative elections

Municipal level elections

Mayoral elections

Municipal legislative elections

References

External links
 National Election Commission 

2014 elections in South Korea
2014